Paolo Colonna (born March 24, 1987 in Altamura) is an Italian former professional cyclist.

Major results
2013
 1st  Road race, National Amateur Road Championships
 1st Stage 3 Giro del Friuli Venezia Giulia
 2nd Gran Premio San Giuseppe

References

External links

1987 births
Living people
Italian male cyclists
People from Altamura
Cyclists from Apulia
Sportspeople from the Metropolitan City of Bari